Tuni railway station may refer to:
 Tuni railway station, Adelaide, a closed station on the former Willunga railway line
 Tuni railway station, Andhra Pradesh serves the town of Tuni on the Howrah–Chennai main line